Una donna da sognare (Italian for A Woman to Dream) is a studio album by Italian singer Patty Pravo, released in 2000 by Sony Music.

Overview
Most of the songs on the album were co-written by two female Italian songwriters: Pia Tuccitto and Bettina Baldassari, and the final material was produced by Vasco Rossi and Gaetano Curreri. Rossi had collaborated with the singer on the 1997 hit single "...E dimmi che non vuoi morire".

Una donna da sognare was a top 10 success on the Italian albums chart, despite lukewarm critical reception. The title track served as the lead single and reached no. 11 in Italy. It was followed by two more singles, "Una mattina d'estate" ("Summer Morning") and "Se chiudi gli occhi" ("If You Close the Eyes"), but they were not as successful in the charts. The music video for "Una mattina d'estate" was filmed in the Botanical Garden of Oropa near Biella and premiered in July 2000.

In a 2004 interview the singer spoke unfavourably of the album, describing it as "very poor", to the point that she wanted to withdraw it from the market the day after it was released. She reflected that Rossi "did a good job" but she did not get along well with his team.

Track listing
"Una donna da sognare" – 4:21
"Se chiudi gli occhi" – 3:59
"Sparami al cuore" – 3:26
"Una mattina d'estate" – 4:05
"Seduttori sedati" – 3:33
"Parliamone" – 3:58
"Buongiorno a te" – 4:51
"Innamorata d'amore" – 3:25
"Count Down" – 4:02
"Tienimi" – 2:57

Charts

References

External links
 Una donna da sognare – official audio on YouTube
 Una donna da sognare on Discogs

2000 albums
Italian-language albums
Patty Pravo albums